HMS Paradise is a British comedy television series which originally aired on ITV between 1964 and 1965. It is set at a Royal Navy station on an island off the Dorset coast where very little actual work takes place. The show bore strong similarities to The Navy Lark, a popular radio series. All episodes are now considered to be lost.

Main cast
 Frank Thornton as Commander Fairweather
 Robin Hunter as Lieutenant Pouter
 Richard Caldicot as Captain Turvey
 Ronald Radd as CPO Banyard
 Angus Lennie as Able Seaman Murdoch
 Priscilla Morgan as Amanda
 Graham Crowden as Commander Shaw
 Ambrosine Phillpotts as Mrs. Turvey

A number of actors appeared in individual episodes of the series including Patrick Troughton, Wendy Richard, Donald Hewlett, Clive Dunn, Cardew Robinson, Sheree Winton, Martine Beswick, John Bluthal, Ernest Clark, Barbara Hicks, Pat Coombs, Robert Dorning, Howard Lang, Hugh Latimer and Brian Oulton.

References

Bibliography
 Wagg, Stephen. Because I Tell a Joke or Two: Comedy, Politics and Social Difference. Routledge, 2004.

External links
 
 

1964 British television series debuts
1965 British television series endings
1960s British comedy television series
ITV sitcoms
English-language television shows
Television shows produced by Associated-Rediffusion